University of Massachusetts Transportation Services, abbreviated to UMass Transit Services or UMass Transit, is a department within the University of Massachusetts Amherst (UMass Amherst) that provides mass transit services to the UMass Amherst campus and other members of the Five Colleges Consortium in eastern Hampshire County, as well as outlying towns. Similar to other large campus transportation systems, such as UGA Campus Transit in Georgia and Unitrans in California, UMass Transit buses are driven by students attending UMass Amherst.

Services

Fixed-route services 
UMass Transit operates as a contractor for the Pioneer Valley Transit Authority (PVTA), which is headquartered in Springfield, the largest municipality of the region. This setup exists because PVTA, as a regional transit authority established under Chapter 161B of the Massachusetts General Statutes, is forbidden under Section 25 of the same statute from operating routes directly. PVTA thus contracts with the school to operate certain routes (other routes in the system are operated by First Transit employees). UMass Transit buses in fixed route service are owned by the PVTA and are painted in their standard livery. These buses are numbered in the 3000 series, and are between 35 and 60 feet in length. The 60-feet buses were acquired in 2013 to accommodate student crowds on the North Pleasant Street through routes Gold 30 and Pink 31.

Field trip services 
In addition to operating tendered services for the PVTA, UMass Transit also maintains an activity fleet of buses of various types for charter by student groups within the UMass Amherst community. These buses are generally painted to match the school colors of white and maroon.

Fixed routes 
The following routes are operated by UMass Transit Services on behalf of the PVTA. Most buses only display the destination.

Note: By order of the Amherst Police Department and UMass Police Department, in an effort to curb student crowds and maintain order, the Fearing Street bus stops in Amherst are bypassed by all campus buses, along with the B43 route, after 10 p.m. on Thursday, Friday, and Saturday nights during full service periods. The North Village bus stop in North Amherst is bypassed after 11 p.m. on Thursday, Friday, and Saturday nights during full service periods.

UMass and Five Colleges routes

UMass Outreach routes 

These routes, operated by UMass Transit, are targeted not toward the UMass student body, but towards the year-round local population in the area.

Fares 

UMass Transit buses are not equipped with fareboxes or fare registers.

Students attending any colleges in the Five Colleges Consortium have a fee included in their tuition bills (service fee for UMass Amherst students and student activity fees for the other colleges) for each semester that prepays their bus fares for the semester and funds the Five Colleges bus system, along with fares on the B43 local route between Amherst College and Smith College via UMass. UMass Transit buses are free.

Holiday and school break service levels 
While the population of Amherst is nominally 37,819 as per the 2010 census, that figure includes the student population of the Five Colleges, many of whom are only part-time residents and who account for approximately 60 percent of that figure. As such, when classes are not in session, service is greatly reduced and often suspended on many routes, and other routes will have service ending early.

All UMass Transit service is suspended on New Year's Day, Memorial Day, Independence Day, Thanksgiving Day, and Christmas Day. On other days when classes are not in session, UMass Transit routes operate on a reduced service schedule.

References

External links 
University of Massachusetts Transportation Services – official site

University of Massachusetts Amherst
University and college bus systems
Bus transportation in Massachusetts
Amherst, Massachusetts